Dupontia levis is a species of small air-breathing land snail, terrestrial pulmonate gastropod mollusk in the family Euconulidae, the hive snails. This species is endemic to Mauritius.

References

Dupontia (gastropod)
Gastropods described in 1908
Taxonomy articles created by Polbot
Endemic fauna of Mauritius